Robert Wilson (8 April 1916 — 10 November 2004) was a Scottish first-class cricketer.

Wilson was born at Edinburgh in April 1916 and was educated at the North District School. A club cricketer for Perthshire Cricket Club, Wilson made his debut for Scotland in first-class cricket against Yorkshire at Glasgow in 1952. He made a further two first-class appearances for Scotland in that year, against Ireland at Paisley and Worcestershire at Worcester on Scotland's tour of England. Playing as a right-arm fast-medium bowler, he took 8 wickets at an average of 20.87, with best figures of 2 for 16. As a lower order batsman, he scored 5 runs. By profession, he was a sports shop manager. Wilson died at Perth in November 2004.

References

External links

1918 births
2004 deaths
Cricketers from Edinburgh
Scottish cricketers